The 1947 California Golden Bears baseball team represented the University of California in the 1947 NCAA baseball season. The Golden Bears played their home games at Evans Diamond. The team was coached by Clint Evans in his 18th season at California.

The Golden Bears won the inaugural College World Series, defeating the Yale Bulldogs two games to none in the best of three championship series.

Roster

Schedule

Awards and honors 
Nino Barnise
All-America First Team 
All-District 8 First Team

John Fiscalini
All-America First Team 
All-District 8 First Team

Jackie Jensen
All-America First Team
All-District 8 First Team

References

California
California Golden Bears baseball seasons
College World Series seasons
NCAA Division I Baseball Championship seasons
Pac-12 Conference baseball champion seasons
Golden Bear
California